Daoyin is a series of cognitive body and mind unity exercises practiced as a form of Daoist neigong, meditation and mindfulness to cultivate jing (essence) and direct and refine qi, the internal energy of the body according to Traditional Chinese medicine. These exercises are often divided into yin positions, lying and sitting, and yang positions, standing and moving. 
The practice of daoyin was a precursor of qigong, and was practised in Chinese Taoist monasteries for health and spiritual cultivation. Daoyin is also said to be a primary formative ingredient in the well-known "soft styles" of the Chinese martial arts, of Taiji quan. and middle road styles like Wuxingheqidao.

The main goal of daoyin is to create flexibility of the mind therefore creating harmony between internal and external environments, which relaxes, replenishes and rejuvenates the body, developing in its practitioners a vital and healthy spirit.

In the West, daoyin is sometimes mistakenly equated with "daoist yoga" or "yin yoga" as "dao" and "yin" are mistakenly read as Dao, as in "Daoism", and Yin, as in "Yin-Yang".

The Daoyin Tu

A painted scroll on display at the Hunan Provincial Museum and known as the Daoyin Tu found in tomb three at Mawangdui in 1973 and dated to 168 BC shows coloured drawings of 44 figures in standing and sitting postures performing daoyin exercises. It is the earliest physical exercise chart in the world so far, and illustrates a medical system which does not rely on external factors such as medication, surgery or treatments, but utilizes solely internal factors to prevent disease.

The images include men and women, young and old. Their postures and movements differ from one another. Some are sitting, some are standing, and still others are practicing Daoyintu or exercising using apparatuses.

Translation of the texts covering the document show that the early Chinese were aware of the need for both preventive and corrective breathing exercises.
The exercises can be divided into three categories:
 Postures of bodily exercises such as stretching arms and legs, leaning over, hopping, dancing, breathing exercises and using various equipment such as a stick and a ball.
 Imitating animal behaviour such as dragon, monkey, bear and crane.
 Exercises targeted at specific diseases.

Effects
A typical daoyin exercise will involve movement of the arms and body in time with controlled inhalation and exhalation. Each exercise is designed with a different goal in mind, for example calmative effects or expanded lung capacity.

According to Mantak Chia the practice of daoyin has the following effects: harmonization of the qi, relaxation of the abdominal muscles and the diaphragm, training of the "second brain" in the lower abdomen, improvement of health and structural alignment.

See also
 Chinese alchemy
 Dantian
 Huangdi Neijing
 Internal alchemy
 Jing
 Lee-style t'ai chi ch'uan
 Silk reeling
 Taoist philosophy
 Wudang Mountains
 Yangsheng (Daoism)
 Yin Yoga
 Yinshu
 Zhang Sanfeng

References

8. Smith, Ronald and Carmone, Antonio (2022), Shadows of Mawangdui Animating the Daoyintu, Three Pines Press, ISBN 9781931483704

External links
 Entry on Daoyin from the Center for Daoist Studies
 The origin of Daoyin Inscription from a Warring State Period cultural relic - neigong.net
 Theory of essence Qi and spirit - neigong.net
 Entry on Tao Yin at the Seahorse Mediawiki
 马王堆汉墓陈列全景数字展厅—湖湖南省博物馆 (Virtual tour of the Mawangdui Han Tombs exhibit at the Hunan Provincial Museum).

Chinese philosophy
Chinese words and phrases
Meditation
Qigong
Tai chi
Taoist practices
Physical exercise